Eric Stefan Persson (born 22 December 1954) is a Swedish professional ice hockey executive and former player. He is the general manager of Borås HC hockey club in Sweden. Persson played for nine seasons with the New York Islanders of the National Hockey League (NHL), where he was a member of four Stanley Cup championship teams in the early 1980s.

Playing career
Persson made his playing debut as an 18-year-old defenceman with Piteå IF. In 1973 he joined Brynäs. While with Brynäs, he received his first national championship silver medal and two national championship gold medals, in 1976 and 1977. It was during this time that the New York Islanders drafted him, so Persson decided to go overseas to play in the NHL.

Persson's responsible, defensive style was endorsed highly by the Islanders head coach, Al Arbour, and Persson's career in the NHL started swiftly. Persson also showed an adept passing ability and an occasional scoring touch. This was no more apparent than during the Islanders first Stanley Cup playoff run in Game 1 of the 1980 Finals against the Philadelphia Flyers. It was late in the third period, when Persson scored the game-tying goal to force a sudden-death overtime that the Islanders won. Outdoing his regular season output of four goals, Persson scored five goals in the 1980 playoffs, and had serious consideration to become the first Swede to capture the Conn Smythe Trophy, which is awarded for MVP of the Stanley Cup playoffs. Persson was part of the first NHL team (1979–80 New York Islanders) to win a Stanley Cup with Europeans on its roster. The Islanders, with Persson as a regular on their backline, captured four consecutive Stanley Cups (1980, 1981, 1982, 1983). He also set another record with the Islanders, playing more games than any other Swedish player in the NHL at that time.

During nine seasons with the Islanders, including playoffs, Persson played in 724 games, scored 59 goals and had 367 assists. He sent the four diamond rings he received for the four Stanley Cup wins to his father, Gösta, in the northern city of Piteå, where he had begun his hockey career.

During the late stages of the 1985–86 season, the Islanders management, starting to lose the commitment from its owner to its product, decided that it was no longer prudent to pay Persson's salary, so they traded him to the Winnipeg Jets for a player to be named later. Persson had become a part of the community on Long Island, his only U.S. residence, and was so distraught about the trade that he decided, almost immediately, not to report to Winnipeg, and instead retired from the NHL altogether. Instead, he returned to Sweden and joined Sweden's big-league Borås HC, and was later given an administrative position with the team. After that he was asked to become the national junior team's general manager.

He was inducted into the Piteå Wall of Fame in 2006.

Career statistics

Regular season and playoffs

International

References

External links
Picture of Stefan Persson's Name on the 1980 Stanley Cup Plaque
Picture of Stefan Persson's Name on the 1982 Stanley Cup Plaque

1954 births
Borås HC players
Brynäs IF players
Living people
New York Islanders draft picks
New York Islanders players
People from Bjurholm Municipality
Stanley Cup champions
Swedish expatriate ice hockey players in the United States
Swedish ice hockey defencemen
Sportspeople from Västerbotten County